Ronnie Noan (born 20 February 1969) is a Papua New Guinean boxer. He competed in the men's flyweight event at the 1992 Summer Olympics.

References

External links
 

1969 births
Living people
Flyweight boxers
Papua New Guinean male boxers
Olympic boxers of Papua New Guinea
Boxers at the 1992 Summer Olympics
Place of birth missing (living people)